City of Refuge is the third album by singer, songwriter, and banjoist Abigail Washburn. Produced and mixed by Tucker Martine, City of Refuge boasts an extensive list of collaborators, players, and singers, including Bill Frisell, Jeremy Kittel, Viktor Krauss, guzheng master Wu Fei, and Kai Welch. It was engineered by Kevin Dailey

Track listing

References

2011 albums
Abigail Washburn albums
Rounder Records albums
Albums produced by Tucker Martine